Tahir Muhedini is the honorary president of the Party for Justice, Integration and Unity. He won a council seat in the Municipality of Tirana as a result of the 2007 local elections.

References

Living people
Year of birth missing (living people)
Politicians from Tirana
Party for Justice, Integration and Unity politicians